Robert Matthew Turnbull McDonald (26 September 1931 – 9 June 2002) was a Canadian professional football player, businessman, insurance agent, public servant and politician. McDonald served as a Progressive Conservative party member of the House of Commons of Canada.

Born in Hamilton, Ontario, Bob McDonald joined the Hamilton Tiger-Cats as a defensive halfback in 1950 and won the Canadian Football League's Gruen Trophy as rookie of the year in the Big Four eastern conference. He quit professional football after contracting poliomyelitis on 6 August 1953 after which he required the use of crutches.

Recovered from the illness, his new career was selling insurance. As the 1957 federal election approached, the Progressive Conservative party recruited McDonald as their candidate in the Hamilton South riding. On election day, 10 June 1957, a 25-year-old McDonald defeated Liberal party incumbent Russell Reinke as part of an Ontario sweep by the Tories, helping John Diefenbaker win a minority government.

After winning two more terms in the 1958 and 1962 federal elections, McDonald was defeated by William Dean Howe of the New Democratic Party in the 1963 election. McDonald served three terms from the 23rd to 25th Canadian Parliaments.

After leaving federal politics McDonald became a Hamilton school trustee in 1964 and returned to business for a decade, running Crystal Glass and Plastics. He moved to provincial government in the 1970s as general manager of the Ontario Mortgage Corporation. From 1978 to 1991, he held various deputy minister positions with the Government of Ontario. He also served on the Peel Police Services Board and the National Parole Board.

McDonald died in June 2002, survived by his wife, two daughters and a son.

References

External links
 

1931 births
2002 deaths
Businesspeople from Ontario
Canadian Football League Rookie of the Year Award winners
Canadian sportsperson-politicians
Hamilton Tiger-Cats players
Members of the House of Commons of Canada from Ontario
Ontario Rugby Football Union players
Players of Canadian football from Ontario
Politicians from Hamilton, Ontario
Progressive Conservative Party of Canada MPs
Sportspeople from Hamilton, Ontario